Aidan Lyons (December 1878 – 12 February 1910) was a South African cricketer. He played in thirteen first-class matches for Eastern Province between 1902/03 and 1908/09.

See also
 List of Eastern Province representative cricketers

References

External links
 

1878 births
1910 deaths
Cricketers from Cape Colony
Eastern Province cricketers
Cricketers from Port Elizabeth